Charles Lee Watkins (1879-1966) was the first Parliamentarian of the United States Senate.

Early life and education
Watkins was born on August 10, 1879, in Mount Ida, Arkansas. He attended the University of Arkansas School of Law.

Career 
Watkins started his career as a clerk in the offices of the Arkansas Attorney General and of the Governor of the State of Arkansas from 1899–1901. From 1902 through 1903, Watkins was the clerk of the commission created by the Arkansas General Assembly for the creation of the infrastructure and exhibits for the Arkansas portion of the centennial exposition of the Louisiana Purchase display at the 1904 World's Fair, held in St. Louis, Missouri.

In 1904, Watkins began working in the United States Senate as a stenographer. In 1919, after already transferring to and working on the Senate floor as a journal clerk, he began researching the Congressional Record for previous Senate rules decisions. In 1923, his career as the Senate Parliamentarian began in an unofficial manner. After periods of confusion and controversy, in 1935, the Senate created the Parliamentarian of the United States Senate and Watkins served as its first.

In 1964, after showing declining memory, and 60 years of service to the Senate, 85-year-old Watkins was replaced as Parliamentarian of the United States Senate.

Personal life
Watkins married Martha Heard Walker in 1903 and they had one son. After Walker died, Watkins married Barbara Laura Sandmeier in 1944. Watkins died on August 30, 1966, in a Bethesda, Maryland, nursing home at the age of 87.

References 

None

Parliamentarians of the United States Senate
1879 births
1966 deaths
Stenographers
People from Mount Ida, Arkansas
University of Arkansas School of Law alumni